Kellie & Kristen are an American female twin-sister Christian worship and gospel music duo of Kellie Nicole Fuselier and Kristen Michelle Fuselier, coming from Alexandria, Louisiana. They started as a duo in 2014, while their first extended play, We Receive, was released in 2016.

Background
The twin-sister duo are from Alexandria, Louisiana, where they both graduated from Alexandria Senior High School, in 2007, while Kellie Nicole Fuselier became a Licensed Master of Social Work and Kristen Michelle Fuselier obtained a degree in Christian Studies. They were born on January 17, 1989. They both currently work and reside in Nashville, TN.

Music history
The group started in 2014, with their first extended play, We Receive, that released on January 15, 2016, two days before the duo's 27 birthdays.

Members
 Kellie Nicole Fuselier (born January 17, 1989)
 Kristen Michelle Fuselier (born January 17, 1989)

Touring Members
 Johnny Miller, V (guitars)

Discography
EPs
 We Receive (January 15, 2016)

References

External links
 

American musical duos
Musical groups from Louisiana
2014 establishments in Louisiana
Musical groups established in 2014